Jahmani Swanson is an American basketball player for the Harlem Globetrotters.

Born with dwarfism, Swanson is 4-foot-5 inches tall. Years of hard work and dedication led Swanson to amass a large following of his own on social media. He sent waves through the Internet captivating thousands of fans, celebrities and the Globetrotters with his amazing handles, lightning speed and agility on the court.

Basketball
Nicknamed "Mini Michael Jordan" for his ball handling skills, he is well-known for his online basketball videos involving him playing against players in streetball who are almost twice his height. Some photos from these videos have made several online news stories. He played for Monroe College, a junior college in the Bronx, and played professionally with other touring exhibition teams.

Born in the Bronx and raised in Harlem, he was a star player in the New York Towers Basketball team, who is one of the most successful teams in the Dwarf Athletic Association. He has also competed in the World Dwarf Games.

Harlem Globetrotters
In 2017, Swanson signed with the Harlem Globetrotters to be a part of their 2018 "Amazing Feats of Basketball" World Tour. Nicknamed "Hot Shot," he will tour the world with the famous team.

Tours
Jahmani has travelled all around the world playing basketball, but is known to go to schools in his spare time to promote people with Dwarfism to do sports and other activities despite their height.

He has inspired many children and adults, while also teaching people about dwarfism.

References

Living people
Year of birth missing (living people)
People with dwarfism
Basketball players from New York (state)
American men's basketball players